Askam and Ireleth is a civil parish in the Borough of Barrow-in-Furness in Cumbria, England.  It contains twelve listed buildings that are recorded in the National Heritage List for England.  Of these, two are listed at Grade II*, the middle of the three grades, and the others are at Grade II, the lowest grade.  The parish contains the villages of Ireleth and Askam-in-Furness and the surrounding countryside.  Ireleth is the older village and is on a hillside to the east of the railway.  Askam-in-Furness is on more level ground to the west of the railway.  The listed buildings consists of houses in Ireleth, buildings in Askam railway station, a church, a drinking fountain, and a house, farmhouses and farm buildings in the countryside.


Key

Buildings

References

Citations

Sources

Lists of listed buildings in Cumbria